Over a period of six months, Colorado legislation HB 20–1065, the Colorado Harm Reduction Substance Use Disorders Law, passed through both houses of the state legislature with bipartisan sponsorship and was signed into law by Governor Jared Polis (D). The law provides support mechanisms and medications to individuals with substance abuse disorder. It also provides protection to pharmacists and ordinary Good Samaritans who are attempting to assist those with the potential of drug overdose and its subsequent consequences.

Background 
In late 2019, several issues were facing the treatment of substance abuse disorders in Colorado. The increasing persistence of fentanyl found in other addictive drugs like heroin or opioids and ensuing overdose. For example, overdoses related to fentanyl tripled in Denver 2017–2019. There was growing concern, mostly from local health departments, about the efficacy of needle-exchange programs. Although a "Good Samaritan" law was extant protecting individuals who administered the nasal spray naloxone Narcan or the injection Evzio and research had indicated that both drugs remained chemically stable after their expiration dates, even when kept in less-than-ideal conditions, there was no legal protection for individuals who might dispense expired naloxone products to someone experiencing a drug overdose.

Legislation 
On January 8, 2020, legislation was introduced in the Colorado House of Representatives by Rep. Chris Kennedy (D-District 23) and Rep. Leslie Herod (D-District 8). The bill was sent to the House Health and Insurance Committee. After three readings, the House passed the bill, Harm Reduction Substance Use Disorders Bill HB 20–1065; it was then taken up by the Colorado Senate on June 9, 2020, where it was sponsored by Sen. Brittany Pettersen (D-District 22) and Sen. Kevin Priola (R-District 25) and assigned to the State, Veterans and Military Affairs Committee. After amendment, it was passed by the committee and referred to the Senate as a whole, where it was passed on June 11. HB 20-1065 was forwarded to Gov. Jared Polis (D) and signed into law on July 13, 2020.

The bill requires that the cost of opioid antagonists such as Narcan and Evzio be covered by health insurance. It provided liability protection to people using an expired opioid antagonist in "good faith." Pharmacists are allowed to provide clean syringes to individuals requesting them; the pharmacists are also protected from prosecution under drug paraphernalia laws. They must also inform individuals filling opioid pain-killer prescriptions on the availability of opioid antagonists. Non-profit organizations are permitted to conduct clean-needle programs without local board of health approval but with a reporting requirement.

Opposition 
The most significant opposition to the bill came from local boards of health who were concerned that the law would remove the boards from control of needle-exchange programs. The non-profit running such programs are required to garner approval from boards of health before opening. The boards of health were also perturbed that syringe programs might lead to higher crime locales around them, even though CDC research has said there are stable crime rates in areas where needle-exchange programs operate.

See also 

 California Naloxone Requirement Bill
 Illinois Opioids-Covid-19-Naloxone Resolution
 New Jersey Opioid Antidote Prescription Bill
 New York Mandatory Opioid Antagonist Prescription Bill
 South Carolina Opioid Overdose Prevention Bill

References

United States state health legislation
Colorado statutes